Robert I (died 1120), count of Aversa and prince of Capua from 1106, on the death of his elder and heirless brother Richard, was the second eldest son of Jordan I of Capua and Gaitelgrima, daughter of Guaimar IV of Salerno.

He tried to be the papal protector which his father and grandfather had been and he sent three hundred knights to rescue Pope Paschal II and his sixteen cardinals during their imprisonment by Emperor Henry V in 1111.  However, his troops were turned back by the count of Tusculum, Ptolemy I, and never made it to their goal.

In 1114, he and Jordan of Ariano assaulted papal Benevento, but the Archbishop Landulf II made peace with them.

In 1117, Paschal fled to him and he hosted his successor, Gelasius II, later in 1118, even escorting him back to Rome with his army.

Though he did not recognise the Apulian suzerainty which his brother had been forced to acknowledge, he was nonetheless a petty and secondary power in the Mezzogiorno.  He died in 1120, leaving a son and successor in the infant Richard III. An unnamed daughter of his was married to King Stephen II of Hungary in the same year.

References
Norwich, John Julius. The Normans in the South 1016-1130. Longmans: London, 1967.

1120 deaths
Italo-Normans
Norman warriors
Counts of Aversa
Princes of Capua
Year of birth unknown